Lustra may refer to:

Lustrum (plural "Lustra"), a period of five years.
Lustra, poetry, by Ezra Pound.
Lustra, Campania, a commune in the province of Salerno (Campania, Italy).
Lustra (album), a 1997 album by British band Echobelly.
Lustra (band), a pop punk band best known for the song "Scotty Doesn't Know" in the movie EuroTrip